Life is Feudal: MMO was a massively multiplayer online role-playing game in a medieval setting, developed by indie studio Bitbox Ltd. and published by Xsolla. The Open Beta release of the game occurred on November 17. The game entered Steam Early Access in January 2018. In December 2020, Bitbox announced that the game would be shut down following financial difficulties and a relationship breakdown with the game's publisher, Xsolla. On January 18, 2021, the game's servers were permanently shut down.

Gameplay 
Life is Feudal: MMO supported full terraforming of the environment, free construction, a branched system of crafts, survival elements, a non-armored combat system and realistic physics. Life is Feudal: MMO's gameplay occurred in a persistent 21x21 km map and included mechanisms for guilds of players to claim land and build trade routes.

Terraforming and mining 

In-game terrain was divided into cells, each of which is assigned a height value relative to sea level. In Life is Feudal, terrain could be modified by either lowering or raising the tile by 0.1 from its height. When lowering terrain the players gains a chunk of material removed from the ground while it costs 1 chunk of material in raising the ground. However, only soft ground material could be raised or lowered, and there were limitations in modifying the terrain depending on the fall off mechanics of the material.

Players could dig tunnels, create canyons, mounds, lower and raise the ground according to their own needs.

Social and political system 

Life is Feudal encouraged players to collaborate via its guilds system. This feature allowed players to divide duties between community members to quicken in-game progress. Establishing a guild only required one person, but the holding of a "Guild Claim" required at least 10 players to be officially registered as a member of that guild. After a guild claimed lands, the number of registered members must have remained at or above 10 for the monument to keep standing and the lands to remain property of the guild. The guild monument is a structure in the form of a sword thrust into the ground.

After the construction, a certain number of land property or a claim was held by guild. The guild claim was divided into three parts: The town claim, a 20 block diameter circle that radiates out from the monument, the realm claim, which expands as your monument upgrades and the influence zone which is a zone that determines how far your guild influence reaches. This Influence Zone was a feature added to stop people from putting up private claims to harass guilds. During Judgement Hour, the primary time that fighting takes place in the game, ALL items on the realm claim will be vulnerable to attack by enemies, as well, any claims that are placed in the influence zone of another guild can be used by the guild leaders. The Town Claim will remain invulnerable during judgement hour.

To maintain the land claim, the monument must be regularly presented with sacrifices with valuable items. In the presence of systematic offerings, the radius of the guild claim will increase and spread to a set number of tiles based on tier. In the case of absence of systematic sacrifices, the guild risks to lose the monument, which is fraught with the loss of all guild lands. The monument itself can be improved with time, this will allow the guild to expand their claim further.

In total, several types of monuments are distinguished:

Another important component of social interaction was the element of karma, which makes possible to determine the alignment of the character. Depending on the actions of the player, his karma could be lowered or increased. For example, if a player kills innocent people, marauds on the remnants of cities, invades foreign lands or robs graves, the indicator of his karma will be relentlessly reduced. This is fraught with the acquisition of the status of Criminal, which allows any player to kill and rob the holder of the status without the risk of losing karma himself, as well as a serious decrease in skills after death.

Economic system 
The basis of the economic system of Life is Feudal: MMO were "Trading posts." A trading post could be built by any player at any point of the map. Any player who has access to a trading post will be able to store a few of his belong in his personal cell.

The main functionality of a trading post was to put on sale items from the player's personal cell.

When buying items, players must have independently brought money to that trading post and then export the purchased goods from the trading post.

Battle System 
Melee damage system accounts for mass and velocity.

Every weapon had its own unique set of damaging nodes and each group deals a certain type of damage. Players could perform 4 types of directional attacks:
 Left to right swing
 Right to left swing
 Overhead attack
 Thrust
Depending on attack direction a certain group of damaging nodes become active and will deal damage. During an attack animation damaging nodes track their positions every 32 ms and connect their current position with their position 32 ms ago resulting in a damaging vector. The longer that vector – the faster that node was traveling. If that vector crosses a body part of a victim, then a hit will be detected and further damage calculations will occur. These damage calculation will measure the length of a vector that triggered a hit and will convert it into a speed relative to the victim.

In order to give players a chance to test their might, there was made an event called "Judgement Hour". When this event comes into action, the protection of the monument is suspending. Therefore, as a result of that, villages and cities could be robbed or destroyed without any consequences.

Plot

Universe 
The main storyline of Life is Feudal: MMO followed two events: the plot of the mysterious divine intervention which has led to an instant disappear of the greatest empire known to the World – the Vulpic Empire and a constant memory black out of its citizens, followed after that incident. Still, due to some extraordinary reasons, beliefs and religion of people managed to make it through all stages of cataclysm. According to the official lore, the world of mortals, Sparksvaard, rests upon the branches of the World Tree. The overall Creator of it happens to be unknown. One day Svefnii, the Sleeping God, the one who blamed for starting the cataclysm, will awaken and plunge the universe into the new chaos, which will leave nothing behind and is going to be the end of the known world. The World Tree is a tree of immense size. The worlds of Elgverden – all the worlds of the inhabitable universe – are borne upon its branches. It is believed that the branches of this tree can be seen in each of the worlds, but at the very least, they can be seen in the world of people, Sparksvaard. One of the branches has been found at Abelle – the successor of the Vulpic Empire. Most of the survivors made it here, hoping to start a new society within the Realm. Therefore, the main objective of the game was to establish a kingdom which will not be inferior to the former one.

Development 
The last update to Life is Feudal: MMO occurred on January 8, 2021.

Reception 
Bleeding Cool praised the beta version of Life is Feudal: MMO in 8.5 points out of ten, calling the project "labor of love."

GameStar characterized the game as a "extremely realistic simulator of the Middle Ages." At the same time, the interface of the game was criticized. It was noted that "to interact with each menu you need a lot more clicks than is really necessary."

References 

Massively multiplayer online role-playing games
Video games developed in Russia
Windows games
Windows-only games